Horton Plaza may refer to two places in San Diego, California:
 Horton Plaza Park, a historic city park
 Horton Plaza Mall, a shopping mall